Daniela Todor (née Băbeanu; born 18 November 1988) is a Romanian handballer who plays for Rapid București.

International honours
EHF Champions League:
Semifinalist: 2012

References

1988 births
Living people
Sportspeople from Râmnicu Vâlcea
Romanian female handball players
SCM Râmnicu Vâlcea (handball) players